Pistillachitina is an extinct genus of chitinozoans. It was described by Taugourdeau in 1966.

Species
 Pistillachitina elegans (Eisenack, 1931)
 Pistillachitina pistillifrons (Eisenack, 1939)

References

Prehistoric marine animals
Fossil taxa described in 1966